Sarah Longley (born 1975) is a painter from Belfast, Northern Ireland. She currently lives and works in Lochalsh, Scotland. Her work has been displayed at the Royal Ulster Academy, the Royal Scottish Academy and the Royal Hibernian Academy.

Life
Born in Belfast, Sarah Longley is the daughter of the poet Michael Longley and the literary critic Edna Longley (née Broderick). Longley studied at Manchester Metropolitan University and subsequently trained at the Edinburgh College of Art.

Her work is characterised by dynamic, lively use of colour and an expressive, personal response to her subjects, which include still life, landscape and portraits. She has also created work in response to her father’s poetry collections Sea Asters (2015), The Dipper’s Range (2016) Angel Hill (2017) and Ghetto (2019).

In a review of a solo exhibition for the Irish Times, Aidan Dunne wrote, "The strength of her work rests not only on her assiduous attention to the demands of each area of subject matter, but also, very much, on the consistency of her dark-edged vision".

Her work has been displayed at the Royal Ulster Academy, the Royal Scottish Academy and at the Royal Hibernian Academy.

References

1975 births
Living people
20th-century women artists from Northern Ireland
20th-century Irish women artists
21st-century women artists from Northern Ireland
Alumni of the Edinburgh College of Art
Alumni of Manchester Metropolitan University
Artists from Belfast